Air Chief Marshal Sir Ralph Alexander Cochrane,  (24 February 1895 – 17 December 1977) was a British aviator and Royal Air Force officer, perhaps best known for his role in Operation Chastise, the famous "Dambusters" raid.

Early RAF career
Ralph Cochrane was born on 24 February 1895, the youngest son of Thomas Cochrane, 1st Baron Cochrane of Cults, in the Scottish village of Springfield, Fife. To qualify as a naval officer, he joined the Royal Naval College, Osborne in 1908, and the Royal Naval College, Dartmouth, two years later.  On 15 September 1912, he was commissioned into the Royal Navy as a midshipman.

During the First World War, Cochrane served in the Royal Naval Air Service piloting airships. He also completed a tour as a staff officer in the Admiralty's Airship Department.

In January 1920, he was removed from the Navy List and granted a commission in the Royal Air Force. Between the wars, Cochrane served in various staff positions and commanded No. 3 Squadron from 1924 before attending the RAF Staff College and commanding No. 8 Squadron from 1929. He attended the Imperial Defence College in 1935.

At the request of Group Captain T. M. Wilkes, New Zealand Director of Air Services, in 1936 Cochrane was sent to New Zealand to assist with the establishment of the Royal New Zealand Air Force as an independent service from the army. On 1 April 1937, Cochrane was appointed Chief of the Air Staff of the Royal New Zealand Air Force.

Second World War and the post-war years
During the Second World War, Cochrane commanded No. 7 Group from July 1940, No. 3 Group from September 1942 and No. 5 Group from February 1943; all these Groups were in RAF Bomber Command. 5 Group became the most efficient and elite Main Force bomber group undertaking spectacular raids. Cochrane commanded the Dam-Busters raid. There was intense, sometimes openly hostile, rivalry between Cochrane and Air Vice Marshal Don Bennett, who saw Cochrane's experimentation with low-level target marking through 617 Squadron in 1944 as a direct threat to his own specialist squadrons' reputation.

In February 1945, Cochrane became Air Officer Commanding at RAF Transport Command, a position he held until 1947 when he became Air Officer Commanding at RAF Flying Training Command. During this time he managed the Berlin Airlift. In 1950 Cochrane was appointed Vice-Chief of the Air Staff. Ralph Cochrane retired from the service in 1952. Following his retirement, Cochrane entered the business world notably as director of Rolls-Royce. He was also chairman of RJM exports which manufactured scientific models and is now known as Cochranes of Oxford.

Honours and awards
In the 1939 New Year Honours, Cochrane was appointed a Commander of the Order of the British Empire (Military Division). In the New Year Honours 1943 Cochrane was invested as a Companion of the Order of the Bath (Military Division). In the 1945 New Years Honour list he was invested as a Knight Commander of the Order of the British Empire. In the 1948 King's Birthday Honours he was invested as a Knight Commander of the Order of the Bath. In the 1950 King's Birthday Honours, he was invested as a Knight Grand Cross of the Order of the British Empire.

Dates of rank

References

 

|-
 

|-
 

|-

|-

|-

|-

1895 births
1977 deaths
Military personnel from Fife
Graduates of the Royal College of Defence Studies
Royal Navy officers
Royal Naval Air Service aviators
Royal Air Force air marshals of World War II
Knights Grand Cross of the Order of the British Empire
Knights Commander of the Order of the Bath
Recipients of the Air Force Cross (United Kingdom)
Younger sons of barons
Royal Navy officers of World War I
Ralph
People from Fife